{{DISPLAYTITLE:C19H17ClN2O4}}
The molecular formula C19H17ClN2O4 may refer to:

 Glafenine, a nonsteroidal anti-inflammatory drug, with risk of anaphylaxis and acute kidney failure
 Oxametacin, a non-steroidal anti-inflammatory drug